This is a list of members of the Victorian Legislative Assembly from 1979 to 1982, as elected at the 1979 state election:

 Gippsland South MLA Neil McInnes was elected as a representative of the National Party, but defected to the Liberal Party in August 1980.
 In April 1981, the Labor member for Morwell, Derek Amos, resigned due to ill health. Labor candidate Valerie Callister won the resulting by-election on 27 June 1981.
 In July 1981, the Liberal member for Kew and Premier of Victoria, Rupert Hamer, resigned. Liberal candidate Prue Sibree won the resulting by-election on 15 August 1981.

Members of the Parliament of Victoria by term
20th-century Australian politicians